In visual art, ;), also referred to as , is the filling of the entire surface of a space or an artwork with detail. In physics, horror vacui reflects Aristotle's idea that "nature abhors an empty space."

Origins
Italian art critic and scholar Mario Praz used this term to describe the excessive use of ornament in design during the Victorian age. Other examples of horror vacui can be seen in the densely decorated carpet pages of Insular illuminated manuscripts, where intricate patterns and interwoven symbols may have served "apotropaic as well as decorative functions." The interest in meticulously filling empty spaces is also reflected in Arabesque decoration in Islamic art from ancient times to present. The art historian Ernst Gombrich theorized that such highly ornamented patterns can function like a picture frame for sacred images and spaces. "The richer the elements of the frame," Gombrich wrote, "the more the centre will gain in dignity." 

Another example comes from ancient Greece during the Geometric Age (1100–900 BCE), when horror vacui was considered a stylistic element of all art. The mature work of the French Renaissance engraver Jean Duvet consistently exhibits horror vacui.

Examples
Horror vacui is apparent in some styles of postmodern graphic design, including the work of artists like David Carson or Vaughan Oliver, and in the underground comix movement in the work of S. Clay Wilson, Robert Crumb, Robert Williams, and later comic artists such as Mark Beyer. The paintings of Williams, Faris Badwan, Emerson Barrett, Joe Coleman and Todd Schorr are further examples of horror vacui in the modern Lowbrow art movement. 

The entheogen-inspired visionary art of certain indigenous peoples, such as the Huichol yarn paintings and the ayahuasca-inspired art of Pablo Amaringo, often exhibits this style, as does the psychedelic art movement of the 1960s counterculture. Sometimes the patterned art in clothing of indigenous peoples of Middle and South America exhibits horror vacui. For example, the geometric molas of Kuna people and the traditional clothing on Shipibo-Conibo people.

The artwork in the Where's Wally? series of children's books is a commonly known example of horror vacui, as are many of the small books written or illustrated by the macabre imagination of Edward Gorey.

The Tingatinga painting style of Dar es Salaam in Tanzania is a contemporary example of horror vacui. Other African artists such as Malangatana of Mozambique (Malangatana Ngwenya) also fill the canvas in this way.

The arrangement of Ancient Egyptian hieroglyphs suggests an abhorrence of empty space. Signs were repeated or phonetic complements added to prevent gaps.

Current usage and meaning

There is an inverse relationship between horror vacui and value perception. Commercial designers favor visual clarity in shop window displays and advertising to appeal to affluent and well-educated consumers, on the premise that understatement and restraint appeals to more affluent and educated audiences. 

In one study, 100 clothing stores were surveyed to find patterns and relationship between how efficiently the store's real estate was used and the store's brand prestige. Bulk sales shops and chain stores were found to fill their window displays to maximum capacity, while high-end boutiques often used their space sparsely, with no price tags—the assumption being that if a passersby needed to know the price, they could not afford it.

Analogy
The term is also used as an analogy to the Aristotelian idea that a physical vacuum is impossible, and, therefore, the idea must be rejected. This was widely believed up to the time of Rene Descartes.

See also
Adolf Wölfli
Fractal art, infinitely detailed computer-generated art
Persian carpet

References

External links
Art term: Horror Vacui, by Jack Cantey Fort Wayne Museum of Art 

Art history
Outsider art
Latin words and phrases